"Come Early Morning" is a song written by Bob McDill, which was initially recorded by McDill for his JMI Records album Short Stories, released in 1972. It was subsequently recorded by American country music artist Don Williams. It was released in April 1973 as the second single from his debut album Don Williams Volume One, and it would be a number twelve country chart hit.

The B-Side to the single was the song "Amanda," also written by Bob McDill.

For Williams' single version of "Come Early Morning," Jack Clement produced a promotional film made that is argued to have been one of the first country music videos.

Chart performance

References 

1973 singles
1972 songs
Songs written by Bob McDill
Don Williams songs
Song recordings produced by Allen Reynolds
ABC Records singles